Dave Hoffmeyer (born May 31, 1955), is a retired American soccer midfielder who played professionally in the North American Soccer League and Major Indoor Soccer League.

Hoffmeyer attended the University of Akron, playing on the school's soccer team from 1974 to 1977.  In 1978, he signed with the Detroit Express of the North American Soccer League before moving indoors with the Pittsburgh Spirit of the Major Indoor Soccer League in the fall of 1978.

Hoffmeyer coached the Rice University Lads, a college level soccer club competing against Southwest Conferences schools in 1979

References

External links
 NASL/MISL stats

1955 births
Living people
American soccer players
Akron Zips men's soccer players
Buffalo Stallions players
Denver Avalanche players
Detroit Express players
Major Indoor Soccer League (1978–1992) players
North American Soccer League (1968–1984) players
Pittsburgh Spirit players
Soccer players from St. Louis
Association football midfielders